Guy Clarence Vanderhaeghe  (born April 5, 1951) is a Canadian novelist and short story writer, best known for his Western novel trilogy, The Englishman's Boy, The Last Crossing, and A Good Man set in the 19th-century American and Canadian West. Vanderhaeghe has won three Governor General's Awards for his fiction, one for his short story collection Man Descending in 1982, the second for his novel The Englishman's Boy in 1996, and the third for his short story collection Daddy Lenin and Other Stories in 2015.

Life and career
Guy Vanderhaeghe was born on April 5, 1951 in Esterhazy, a mining town in southeastern Saskatchewan. He received his Bachelor of Arts degree with great distinction in 1971, High Honours in History in 1972 and Master of Arts in History in 1975, all from the University of Saskatchewan. In 1978 he received his Bachelor of Education with great distinction from the University of Regina.  In 1973 he was Research Officer, Institute for Northern Studies, University of Saskatchewan and, from 1974 until 1977, he worked as Archival and Library Assistant at the university.

From 1975 to 1977 he was a freelance writer and editor and in 1978 and 1979 taught English and history at Herbert High School in Herbert, Saskatchewan. In 1983 and 1984 he was Writer-in-Residence with the Saskatoon Public Library and in 1985 Writer-in-Residence at the University of Ottawa. He has been a Visiting Professor of Creative Writing at the University of Ottawa (1985–86), faculty member of the Writing Program of the Banff Centre for the Arts (1990–91), faculty member in charge of senior fiction students in the SAGE Hills Creative Writing Program (1992).  Since 1993, he has served as a visiting professor of English at St. Thomas More College at the University of Saskatchewan.

Vanderhaeghe's first book, Man Descending (1982), was winner of a Governor General's Award and the United Kingdom's Faber Prize. A novel, The Englishman's Boy (1996), won him a second Governor General's Award for Fiction and the Saskatchewan Book Award for Fiction and for Best Book of the Year, and it was shortlisted for both the Giller Prize and the International Dublin Literary Award.

The Last Crossing (2002) was a national bestseller and winner of the Saskatoon Book Award, the Saskatchewan Book Awards for Fiction and for Book of the Year, and the Canadian Booksellers Association Libris Award for Fiction Book of the Year. The novel was selected for the 2004 edition of Canada Reads as the book that should be read by all Canadians.

In 2003, Vanderhaeghe was awarded the Saskatchewan Order of Merit and was made an Officer of the Order of Canada. His 2011 publication of A Good Man finished off his Western trilogy. "Historically spot on, the characters (fictional and real) are incredible, and the plot builds to an incredible bitter sweet ending."

In 2013, he received the Lieutenant Governor's Arts Award for Lifetime Achievement in the Arts, Saskatchewan's highest honour in the arts.

Vanderhaeghe currently lives in Saskatoon. He teaches creative writing as an evening class at St. Thomas Moore College at the University of Saskatchewan. His wife Margaret Elizabeth Vanderhaeghe, a noted artist, died in 2012.

His short story collection Daddy Lenin and Other Stories was published in 2015, and won the Governor General's Award for English-language fiction at the 2015 Governor General's Awards.
His first novel in almost a decade was published in 2021, titled August Into Winter. Set in 1939 in a small prairie town, with a narcissistic man-child on the lam with a scrappy 12-year-old child/lover in tow and a trio of hardened lawmen on his trail.

Bibliography

Novels
My Present Age (Toronto: Macmillan of Canada, 1984).
Homesick (Toronto: McClelland & Stewart, 1989). 
The Englishman's Boy (Toronto: McClelland & Stewart, 1996). 
The Last Crossing (Toronto: McClelland & Stewart, 2002).
A Good Man (Toronto: McClelland & Stewart, 2011).
August Into Winter (2021)

Short story collections
Man Descending (Toronto: Macmillan of Canada, 1982). 
The Trouble With Heroes (Ottawa: Borealis Press, 1983).
Things As They Are? (Toronto: McClelland & Stewart, 1992). 
Daddy Lenin and Other Stories (McClelland & Stewart, 2015).

Plays
I Had a Job I Liked. Once. (Saskatoon: Fifth House, 1992).
Dancock's Dance (Winnipeg: Blizzard Pub., 1996)

References

Further reading
 Nora Tunkel: Crisscrossing Wild West Borders and Identities: Guy Vanderhaeghe, in Tunkel: Transcultural imaginaries. History and globalization in contemporary Canadian literature. Winter, Heidelberg 2012, pp 190 – 197 = doct. thesis, Universität Wien 2009

External links
 
 Guy Vanderhaeghe at The Encyclopedia of Saskatchewan

1951 births
Living people
Canadian male novelists
Canadian male short story writers
Members of the Saskatchewan Order of Merit
Officers of the Order of Canada
University of Saskatchewan alumni
Governor General's Award-winning fiction writers
Writers from Saskatchewan
Harbourfront Festival Prize winners
20th-century Canadian novelists
21st-century Canadian novelists
20th-century Canadian dramatists and playwrights
People from Esterhazy, Saskatchewan
Canadian male dramatists and playwrights
20th-century Canadian short story writers
21st-century Canadian short story writers
20th-century Canadian male writers
21st-century Canadian male writers